The 2012–13 Georgia State Panthers women's basketball team represented Georgia State University in the 2012–13 NCAA Division I women's basketball season. The Panthers, coached by Sharon Baldwin-Tener, were a member of the Colonial Athletic Association, and played their home games on campus at the GSU Sports Arena. The 2012–13 season represented the last season that the Panthers played in the CAA as they joined the Sun Belt Conference in 2013.

Season Notes
Due to Georgia State's exit from the Colonial Athletic Association, the Panthers were not eligible to compete in the CAA basketball tournament.

2012–13 roster
From the official GSU women's basketball site:

2012–13 Schedule

|-
!colspan=9 style="background:#273BE2; color:#FFFFFF;"| Regular Season

References

Georgia State
Georgia State Panthers women's basketball seasons